Earl Thompson or Thomson may refer to:

 Earl Thomson (1895–1971), Canadian Olympic hurdler
 Earl A. Thompson (1891–1967), Engineer
 Earl Thompson (author) (1931–1978), American author
 Earl Foster Thomson (1900–1971), American Olympic equestrian
 Scottie Thompson (basketball) (born 1993), a Filipino basketball player
 Earl Thompson (died 1948), American jazz trumpeter